Duke of Bronte (or Duke of Bronti, or Duke de Brunte) was launched in 1793 (or 1794) in India, under another name. She was renamed in 1800 in London. She then made two voyages as a slaver in the triangular trade in enslaved people before a French privateer captured her in 1804.

Career
Duke of Bronti was admitted to the Registry of Great Britain on 17 November 1800. She first appeared in Lloyd's Register in the supplemental pages to the 1800 volume. Her master is R. Beal, her owner Morton, and her trade London−Africa. She first appeared in the Register of Shipping in 1801, with R. Beale, master, and T. Morton, owner.

Captain Richard P. Beale sailed from London to the Rio Pongo on 1 December 1800. Duke of Bronte took the captives she gathered to Demerara (what is now British Guiana), where she arrived in September 1801.

Between her first and second slave-trading voyages, T. Moreton had sold her to Anthony Calvert, of Camden, Calvert and King.

On 16 August 1802, Captain Beale sailed Duke of Bronte from London on her second slaving voyage. It is not clear where Beale and Duke of Bronte acquired her captives, but she delivered 168 to Kingston, Jamaica, arriving on 18 July 1803. She sailed from Jamaica, bound for London, on 16 November.

Fate
On 3 February 1804, Lloyd's List reported that Duke of Bronti, bound for London, had to put back to Jamaica. Then on 22 June, Lloyd's List reported that a French privateer had captured Duke of Bronti as she was sailing from Jamaica to London and took her into Santiago de Cuba.

In 1804, 30 British slave ships were lost; only one was lost on her way back to Britain after having landed her captives. During the period 1793 to 1807, war, rather than maritime hazards or resistance by the captives was the greatest cause of vessel losses among British slave vessels.

Notes

Citations

References
 

 

1790s ships
British ships built in India
London slave ships
Captured ships
Age of Sail merchant ships
Merchant ships of the United Kingdom